The ninth edition of the Pan Pacific Swimming Championships, a long course (50 m) event, was held in 2002 in Yokohama International Swimming Pool in Yokohama, Japan, from August 24–29.  One world record was set over the six-day competition.

Results

Men's events

Women's events

Medal table

References
Results on GBRSports.com

 
Pan
Pan
Pan Pacific Swimming Championships
International aquatics competitions hosted by Japan
Swimming competitions in Japan